A Book of Songs for Anne Marie is the fourth studio album by American singer-songwriter Baby Dee. It was released on April 20, 2010 under the Drag City label in the US and on Tin Angel Records in the UK. The album is essentially a re-recording of a 150 copy limited-edition CD that was released by Durtro in 2004 with a book of the same name.

Track listing
All songs composed by Baby Dee.
Arrangements by Maxim Moston and Baby Dee.

2004 Version
This version was released as a limited-edition book with CD. It features only Baby Dee, singing and playing piano.

Personnel
Baby Dee – vocals, harp, piano, accordion
Keith Bonner – flute
C.J. Camerieri – trumpet, French horn
John Contreras – cello
Alexandra Knoll – oboe, English horn
Rob Moose – mandolin
Maxim Moston – violin

References

2010 albums
Baby Dee albums
Drag City (record label) albums